The ForYouAwards are French awards, launched in 2022 by Sleeq and Le Guide Ultime to honour French-speaking content creators.

List of ceremonies

Awards

See also 
 About You Awards

References

External links 
  

Awards established in 2022
French awards
Advertising awards
Web awards